Ahmed Abdel-Sattar Nawwas (born 6 July 1984) is a Jordanian footballer who is a goalkeeper for Al-Wehdat  and the Jordan national football team.

International career statistics

Honours
Jordan Premier League: 2005–06
Jordan FA Cup: 2006, 2007, 2013
Jordan FA Shield: 2007
Jordan Super Cup: 2007
AFC Cup: 2007
Best Goalkeeper in Jordan Premier League (2012-2013)

References

External links 
 
 
 

1984 births
Living people
Jordanian Muslims
Jordanian footballers
Jordan international footballers
Jordanian Pro League players
Saudi Professional League players
Association football goalkeepers
Shabab Al-Ordon Club players
Al-Jazeera (Jordan) players
Al-Wehdat SC players
Ettifaq FC players
Jordanian expatriate footballers
Jordanian expatriate sportspeople in Saudi Arabia
Expatriate footballers in Saudi Arabia
2015 AFC Asian Cup players
Sportspeople from Amman
People from Amman
2019 AFC Asian Cup players